Stotzing is a town in the district of Eisenstadt-Umgebung in the Austrian state of Burgenland.

Geography
Stotzing lies in northern Burgenland, near the state capital of Eisenstadt.

References

Cities and towns in Eisenstadt-Umgebung District